Turku Science Fiction Society,  or TSFS, is the oldest science fiction society in Finland. It was founded in 1976. The society publishes its own semiprozine, called Spin, also the oldest in Finland. It maintains a club room at the University of Turku with several related societies.

the TSFS has been the main organiser of Finncon three times, in 1999, 2003  and 2011. The 2003 event was also Eurocon and Baltcon.

Since 1983, the TSFS awards the annual Atorox Award for the best Finnish science fiction short story.

References

Science fiction organizations
Culture in Turku
Organizations established in 1976
1976 establishments in Finland